Zhang Hongjiang is a Chinese computer scientist and executive. He served as CEO of Kingsoft, managing director of Microsoft Advanced Technology Center (ATC) and chief technology officer (CTO) of Microsoft China Research and Development Group (CRD). In 2022, he was elected to the National Academy of Engineering for his technical contributions and leadership in the area of multimedia computing.

Background
Zhang retired in December 2016 from the positions of CEO of Kingsoft, the executive director of Kingsoft board, and the CEO of Kingsoft Cloud. He is a senior advisor of Carlye Group (NASDAQ: CG). He was also the board member of Cheetah Mobile Inc. (NYSE: CMCM), Xunlei Limited (NASDAQ: XNET), and 21Vianet Group, Inc. (NASDAQ: VNET).  

Zhang was a founding member, then the assistant managing director, of Microsoft Research Asia (MSRA). MSRA was reported in 2004 as “The hottest Computer Lab” by MIT Technology Review. While with MSRA, he led efforts to research in Media Computing, Data Mining and Web Search, Natural Language Computing, and Distributed Systems. Prior to joining Microsoft, Zhang was with Hewlett-Packard Labs at Palo Alto, California, where he was a research manager. He also worked at the Institute of Systems Science (today, renamed I2R), National University of Singapore.

A researcher in media computing, more specifically in video and image analysis, search and browsing, over the years, Zhang has authored four books, over 350 scientific papers, and holds 62 US patents. He has been elected Fellow of IEEE and Association for Computing Machinery (ACM) and won the “2008 Asian American Engineers of the Year” award. He is also the recipient of 2010 IEEE Computer Society Technical Achievement Awards and the recipient of 2010 Microsoft Distinguished Scientist.

Zhang served as chief technology officer (CTO) for Microsoft China Research and Development Group (CRD) and managing director of the Microsoft Advanced Technology Center (ATC). In 2011, Zhang left Microsoft and joined Kingsoft as CEO.

Education
PhD in electrical engineering, Technical University of Denmark, Lyngby, Denmark, 1991
BS in radio and electronics, Zhengzhou University, Henan, China, 1982

Academic activities
International member of NAE, 2022
Editor, Proceedings of IEEE, 2004-
Editor in chief of IEEE Transaction on Multimedia, 2004–2007
Associate editor, IEEE Transaction on Circuits and Systems for Video Technology, 1999–2002
Member of editorial board, IEEE Multimedia, 1998–2002
Founding member of editorial board, International Journal of Multimedia Tools and Application, 1995–1999
Editor, Journal of Visual Communication and Image Representation, 1997–2002
ACM SIGMM executive board, 2002–2004
Chair, ACM Multimedia Conference, Singapore, Oct, 2005
Co-chair, IEEE Multimedia Conference and Expo, Toronto, July 2006

References

External links
MIT Technology Review
Hongjiang Zhang’s Publications 

1960 births
Living people
Microsoft employees
Chinese computer scientists
Businesspeople from Wuhan
Zhengzhou University alumni
Technical University of Denmark alumni
Chinese technology writers
Chinese chief technology officers
Scientists from Hubei
Writers from Wuhan
Chinese chief executives
Fellow Members of the IEEE
Fellows of the Association for Computing Machinery
Foreign associates of the National Academy of Engineering